Communauté d'agglomération de l'Albigeois is the communauté d'agglomération, an intercommunal structure, centred on the city of Albi. It is located in the Tarn department, in the Occitania region, southern France. Created in 2011, its seat is in Albi. Its area is 208.9 km2. Its population was 82,351 in 2019, of which 48,902 in Albi proper.

Composition
The communauté d'agglomération consists of the following 16 communes:

Albi
Arthès
Cambon
Carlus
Castelnau-de-Lévis
Cunac
Dénat
Fréjairolles
Lescure-d'Albigeois
Marssac-sur-Tarn
Puygouzon
Rouffiac
Saint-Juéry
Saliès
Le Sequestre
Terssac

References

Albigeois
Albigeois